Barde may refer to:

Abubakar Barde (1938–2002), Governor of Gongola State, Nigeria (1979 to 1983)
André Barde, the pseudonym of André Bourdonneau (1874–1945), a French writer
Bidushi Dash Barde (1989–2012), Indian actress and model
Konrad Barde (1897–1945), general in the Wehrmacht during World War II
Yakubu Umar Barde, Nigerian politician
Yeshwant Barde (born 1973), Indian former first-class cricketer
Yves-Alain Barde FRS, Professor of Neurobiology at Cardiff University
Idi Barde Gubana (born 1960), Nigerian Karai-Karai politician

See also
La Barde, commune in the Nouvelle-Aquitaine region in southwestern France
El Barde District, district of the southwestern Bakool region of Somalia
Barda (disambiguation)
Bardeh (disambiguation)
Bardi (disambiguation)